Louise-Marie of France (15 July 1737 – 23 December 1787) was a French princess and Discalced Carmelite, the youngest of the ten children of  Louis XV and Maria Leszczyńska. She entered the Carmelite convent, now the Musée d'art et d'histoire de Saint-Denis, at Saint-Denis in 1770 under the name of Thérèse of Saint Augustine and served as prioress in 1773-1779 and 1785–1787. She is venerated by the Roman Catholic Church, having been declared Venerable by Pope Pius IX.

Birth

Louise-Marie of France was born at the Palace of Versailles on 15 July 1737. Her birth was particularly difficult for her mother, who was advised by her physicians that another birth could be fatal. After this, the Queen discontinued sexual relations with the King by refusing him entrance to her bedroom. Not long after this Louis XV, with approval of his minister Cardinal de Fleury, officially acknowledged his first favorite, Louise Julie de Mailly, and the private relationship between the King and Queen was discontinued and they started to live separate lives. The King openly announced this after the birth of Louise when he called her Madame Dernière ('The Last Madame').

As the legitimate daughter of the King, she held the rank of a fille de France, but was as her sisters referred to by the number of her birth, in her case "Madame Septième" (she was actually the eighth daughter, though an older sister, Marie Louise, had died in 1733), but from 1740 onward, when she was baptized, she became known as "Madame Louise".

Fontevraud
In June 1738, the four youngest princesses, Victoire, Sophie and Thérèse (who died at Fontevraud at the age of eight) and Louise, were sent to be raised at the Abbaye de Fontevraud, because the cost of raising them in Versailles with all the status they were entitled to was deemed too expensive by Cardinal Fleury, Louis XV's chief minister, in particular because the new cost of an official mistress had been added to the expenses since the king recognized his favorite.

Their trip was described: "the princesses, who departed from Court in eight coaches and two chaises with twenty wagon loads of luggage, arrived at Fontevrault after a journey lasting thirteen days. The Abbess, who was a Rochechouart-Mortemart, took the trouble to receive them clad all in white and accompanied by four singing girls. She desired that on their arrival the Royal children should be greeted by attractive faces, and colors which would please them." On 20 December 1738 Louise was baptised at Fontevraud; her godfather was François-Marc-Antoine de Bussy, seigneur de Bisé; her godmother was Marie-Louise Bailly-Adenet, first woman of the chamber to her sister Madame Thérèse.

The Abbaye de Fontevraud had been selected because of its status, as it was a prestigious establishment where the abbess was always a member of the highest nobility, but it was not an educational institution, and according to Madame Campan, the sisters were subjected to traumatic disciplinarian methods and neglected in their education:

Louise was described as lively, intelligent, talkative and haughty, and did not hesitate to lecture her staff and demand to be treated with veneration because of her status as princess, such as demanding that those in her service to rise when she entered the room. The nuns worked to subdue her pride, in particular a Mme de Soulanges, and a well known anecdote describes how Louise lectured one of her servant women, who in her view had not been humble enough, by saying: "Am I not the daughter of your King?", upon which the woman replied, apparently upon the instruction of de Soulanges: "And I Madame am I not the daughter of your God?" Another anecdote relates how Louise demanded that all present should rise when a member of the royal house drank: "Stand, ladies! Louise drinks!", upon which de Soulanges exclaimed: "Remain seated".

Physically, Louise was not considered to be beautiful and reportedly suffered from a weak constitution, having a curvature of the spine which resulted in what she called a "hump" on her back, and according to the duke de Luynes: "Madame Louise's head was a little too big for her body".

Already in 1748, when Louise, aged 11, was still in Fontevraud, rumors began to circulate that her father intended her to marry Prince Charles Edward Stuart, pretender to the throne of England. Louise then declared:

Madame Louise
In the spring of 1748, her elder sister Victoire successfully asked permission to return to court, and in November 1750, Louise and her remaining sister Sophie were allowed to return as well, age 13 and 16 respectively.

While their education had been neglected in the convent, they reportedly compensated for this and studied extensively after their return to court, encouraged by their brother, with whom they immediately formed a close attachment: "When Mesdames, still very young, returned to Court, they enjoyed the friendship of Monseigneur the Dauphin, and profited by his advice. They devoted themselves ardently to study, and gave up almost the whole of their time to it; they enabled themselves to write French correctly, and acquired a good knowledge of history. Italian, English, the higher branches of mathematics, turning and dialing, filled up in succession their leisure moments."

Madame Louise never married, and became a part of the group of the four unmarried princesses referred to collectively as Mesdames de France at court. The King referred to them by nicknames: he called Madame Adélaïde ‘Loque’ (Tatters/Rag/Rags/Scraggy), Madame Victoire ‘Coche’ (Pig/Piggy/Sow), Madame Sophie, ‘Graille’ (Grub/Scrap/Carrion crow), and Madame Louise, ‘Chiffe’ (Shoddy silk/Rags).

The life of Louise and her sisters were described by their reader as follows: "Louis XV. saw very little of his family. He came every morning by a private staircase into the apartment of Madame Adélaïde. He often brought and drank there coffee that he had made himself. Madame Adélaïde pulled a bell which apprised Madame Victoire of the King’s visit; Madame Victoire, on rising to go to her sister’s apartment, rang for Madame Sophie, who in her turn rang for Madame Louise. The apartments of Mesdames were of very large dimensions. Madame Louise occupied the farthest room. This latter lady was deformed and very short; the poor Princess used to run with all her might to join the daily meeting, but, having a number of rooms to cross, she frequently in spite of her haste, had only just time to embrace her father before he set out for the chase. Every evening, at six, Mesdames interrupted my reading to them to accompany the princes to Louis XV.; this visit was called the King’s 'debotter',—[Debotter, meaning the time of unbooting.]—and was marked by a kind of etiquette. Mesdames put on an enormous hoop, which set out a petticoat ornamented with gold or embroidery; they fastened a long train round their waists, and concealed the undress of the rest of their clothing by a long cloak of black taffety which enveloped them up to the chin. The chevaliers d’honneur, the ladies in waiting, the pages, the equerries, and the ushers bearing large flambeaux, accompanied them to the King. In a moment the whole palace, generally so still, was in motion; the King kissed each Princess on the forehead, and the visit was so short that the reading which it interrupted was frequently resumed at the end of a quarter of an hour; Mesdames returned to their apartments, and untied the strings of their petticoats and trains; they resumed their tapestry, and I my book."

Louise, as the other two younger sisters, were reportedly dominated by their eldest sister Madame Adélaïde, who engaged herself in political intrigues and campaigns against their father's mistresses. While this submission to their senior sister's rank and dominant nature was not such a problem for the easygoing Victoire or the retiring and reserved Sophie, Madame Louise, who was herself of an intelligent and energetic nature, found this position harder, inspiring in her feelings of oppression and enslavement.

During her first years at court, Louise reportedly indulged in pleasure, and was for a time considered the most worldly of her sisters: "She was passionately fond of every pleasure, was something of a glutton, very fond of dress, incapable of living without every new invention of luxury, had a lively imagination and great leaning to coquetry." Many years later, when Louise had left court to enter a convent without informing her sisters, and the King came into the room of her sister Adélaïde and told her that Louise had gone away in the night, her first cry was reportedly: "With whom?". In 1761, when her sister Victoire visited the waters in Lorraine for medical purposes for the first time in the company of Adélaïde, Louise and her sister Sophie visited Paris for the first time.

A series of events in the 1760s led to a crisis in the life of Louise. On 26 November 1764, she was deeply affected by the banishment of the Jesuits from France, and resolved to secure their return, as well as the conversion of the king's soul. In the following year, the death of her brother the Dauphin in December 1765, followed by that of her sister-in-law, Dauphine Maria Josepha, in 1767 and mother Queen Maria Leszczyńska in June 1768, and the presentation at court of the Comtesse du Barry, the new favorite of Louis XV, pushed Louise to approach Christophe de Beaumont, Archbishop of Paris, asking him to intercede on her behalf with her father the King of her desire to enter the Carmelites, a cloistered and austere Order, at the convent of Saint-Denis.

Entrance to the Order of the Carmelites  

Even before becoming a Carmelite, Louise had begun in secret to wear religious dress and live the convent life while living at Versailles.

The King gave his written consent on 16 February 1770. This was at the same time as the court prepared for the marriage of the new Dauphin (the future Louis XVI) and Archduchess Maria Antonia of Austria. The words, "I Carmelite, and the King all to God", reflected Louise's willingness to redeem with her sacrifice the soul of her father, and expiate his sins.

In April 1770, Louise left court accompanied only by her coach, one maid-of-honour and an equerry. Her departure was very hasty and sudden and created a great surprise at court. The reader of Louise, Madame Campan, described the events around the departure of Louise from court: "Madame Louise had for many years lived in great seclusion; I read to her five hours a day. My voice frequently betrayed the exhaustion of my lungs; the Princess would then prepare sugared water for me, place it by me, and apologise for making me read so long, on the score of having prescribed a course of reading for herself. One evening, while I was reading, she was informed that M. Bertin, 'ministre des parties casuelles', desired to speak with her; she went out abruptly, returned, resumed her silks and embroidery, and made me resume my book; when I retired she commanded me to be in her closet the next morning at eleven o’clock. When I got there the Princess was gone out; I learnt that she had gone at seven in the morning to the Convent of the Carmelites of St. Denis, where she was desirous of taking the veil. I went to Madame Victoire; there I heard that the King alone had been acquainted with Madame Louise’s project; that he had kept it faithfully secret, and that, having long previously opposed her wish, he had only on the preceding evening sent her his consent; that she had gone alone into the convent, where she was expected; and that a few minutes afterwards she had made her appearance at the grating, to show to the Princesse de Guistel, who had accompanied her to the convent gate, and to her equerry, the King’s order to leave her in the monastery. As soon as I obtained permission to do so, I went to St. Denis to see my late mistress; she deigned to receive me with her face uncovered, in her private parlour; she told me she had just left the wash-house, and that it was her turn that day to attend to the linen. "I much abused your youthful lungs for two years before the execution of my project", added she. "I knew that here I could read none but books tending to our salvation, and I wished to review all the historians that had interested me"".

Louise chose to enter the convent at Saint-Denis. Threatened with closure owing to limited financial resources, the convent was now unexpectedly saved by the arrival of a nun with a large dowry, which in turn further attracted significant donations.

Louise assumed the habit of the Carmelites on 10 October 1770. The recently married Dauphine Marie Antoinette gave her the veil. The sermon delivered at the occasion of Louise's vestiture was published, which was common in Italy but not in France, highlighting the sensational nature of this event, which was celebrated by Catholics all over France. She took her religious vows on 12 September 1771 in a lavish ceremony in which the Papal Nuncio presided, dressed in white satin and wearing a million worth of diamonds, in the presence of the king and the rest of the royal family. This time, another of her nieces-in-law, the Countess of Provence, in a very formal ceremony, bestowed upon her the black veil of the Carmelites. With her investiture, Louise chose the name Thérèse of Saint Augustine in honor of Teresa of Ávila, a mystic and reformer of the Carmelite Order. Upon entering the convent, she stated her wish that her cell should be more bare than that of the other Carmelites.

Carmelite

Immediately after she entered the convent, Louise was appointed mistress of novices. Her duties included overseeing no less than 13 young novices. By the end of 1771, Louise was entrusted with the economy of the convent. In 1779 she organized the rebuilding of the ruined church which Richard Mique oversaw.

After her renunciation, Louise came to be in a far more influential position of status than what she had been as the youngest of princesses, and she was reportedly consulted as an authority figure by the king her father, the princes, the ambassadors, the bishops and the archbishops. Her relationship to her sisters never quite recovered after she left court: "The three sisters who were left never pardoned Madame Louise for concealing her intentions, and though they went to see her sometimes, it was with no feelings of pleasure or friendship. Her death was no grief to them." Like her sisters, however, she opposed the wedding of her nephew the Dauphin to Marie Antoinette of Austria, this marriage having been concluded by Choiseul, whom she detested because of his banishment of the Jesuits. This confidence in her counsel did attract attention by contemporaries, "The retirement of Madame Louise, and her removal from Court, had only served to give her up entirely to the intrigues of the clergy. She received incessant visits from bishops, archbishops, and ambitious priests of every rank; she prevailed on the King, her father, to grant many ecclesiastical preferments, and probably looked forward to playing an important part when the King, weary of his licentious course of life, should begin to think of religion. This, perhaps, might have been the case had not a sudden and unexpected death put an end to his career. The project of Madame Louise fell to the ground in consequence of this event." While the intrigues of her sisters Mesdames made them exposed to some hostility, Louise was, despite her political activity, not exposed to the same feelings, though "only her habit saved Sister Therese from being included in this unpopularity."

Prioress 
Louise was elected prioress of the convent on 25 November 1773. She served as prioress from 1773 to 1779 in two consecutive terms, and a third term from 1785.

Louis XV died on 10 May 1774. On 26 May, two weeks after his death, his grandson, Louis XVI (nephew of Louise) visited his aunt at Saint-Denis. Reportedly, Louise continued to solicit favors for others during the reign of her nephew: "She remained in her convent, whence she continued to solicit favours, as I knew from the complaints of the Queen, who often said to me, "Here is another letter from my Aunt Louise. She is certainly the most intriguing little Carmelite in the kingdom". When the interest of the Carmelite Order was at stake, she readily corresponded with the powers that be in order to argue on behalf of the Order.

She was often visited by her niece Madame Élisabeth, who wished to unite her prayers with that of her aunt for the king's welfare. An anecdote is given about one such visit; "Mme Elizabeth arrived at the convent one day quite early, and begged to be allowed to wait on the nuns at their dinner. Leave being granted, she put on an apron and, after kissing the ground, went to the Tour to receive the dishes. All went well, till, as she was distributing the portions, the tray slipped and a dish fell. Her embarrassment was extreme. To relieve her, the august Princess said, 'My niece. After such a gaucherie the culprit should kiss the floor.' This Mme Elizabeth hastened to do, and then cheerfully resumed her office of waitress."

Louise gave assistance to the Carmelites nuns who had left Austria after being expelled by Emperor Joseph II, finding them a place in other French Carmel convents. In June 1783, she hosted 13 Carmelite nuns who were driven from Brussels. The persecution against them was so intense, that, for a time, 58 Carmelite nuns lived at Saint-Denis. Eventually, with the onset of the French Revolution and the closure of convents, the Carmelites were forced to leave France for other countries. Louise also involved in politics and state affairs in regards to religious laws. In November 1787, her nephew Louis XVI granted non-Catholics in France the right to openly practice their religions as well as legal and civil status by the Edict of Versailles. Louise vehemently opposed this law, and sent an eight-page long letter of protest to Louis XVI in which she attacked the Protestants and reproached the king.

Death
Thérèse of Saint Augustine died on 23 December 1787 in Saint-Denis, after suffering from a stomach complaint. Her last words were, according to a fellow Carmelite nun: 

Her nephew King Louis XVI described these words more in detail when he informed her former reader Madame Campan of her death: "I was informed of her death by Louis XVI. "My Aunt Louise", said he to me, "your old mistress, is just dead at St. Denis. I have this moment received intelligence of it. Her piety and resignation were admirable, and yet the delirium of my good aunt recalled to her recollection that she was a princess, for her last words were, 'To paradise, haste, haste, full speed.' No doubt she thought she was again giving orders to her equerry"".

Somewhat more than a year later, began the French Revolution which deposed her family from the throne, and ousted from power the Catholic Church in France. In 1793 the revolutionaries who desecrated the tombs of the kings of France at the Basilica of St Denis did the same to the cemetery of the Carmelite convent. Located near the cloister, the remains of the royal family were disinterred and thrown into a mass grave.

Cause of beatification and canonization
The process of Thérèse of Saint Augustine's beatification took place between 1855 and 1867. Pope Pius IX declared her venerable on 19 June 1873, officially initiating the process of beatification. The process (required at the time) of non-cult takes place in 1885–1886. The process of sanctity was conducted in 1891–1892, and the process of the virtues held from 1896 to 1904. The decree validating these processes was published on 28 November 1906.

Clerics resumed steps toward Thérèse's canonization in Rome under new protocols on 13 December 1985. An association was founded in January 1986 to support the cause of her beatification.

The decree of the heroic virtues of Thérèse of Saint Augustine was published on 18 December 1997. To date, only lack of an officially recognized miracle attributed to her to be declared "Blessed".

Quotes
"Accept, Oh my beloved! Oh the most amiable of husbands! Agree to this heart burning to be yours. You have so many in your possession! Reign alone and reign forever in my soul and all my faculties, my will and all my affections, my body and all my senses [...] What I remember is busier than the memory of your benefits; my mind to be occupied with meditations of your amiable qualities; my heart was filled with that ineffable ardor which you burn for me here. My whole body is purified approaches your sweet flesh; he sacrifices himself for your glory, your work for the sick people, and that its unique efforts, his wishes are most usual to imitate you and become like you." (Eucharistic Meditations interview with our Lord in the Blessed Sacrament, for the octave of Corpus Christi).
"Everything that does not come from God cannot be good and scruples are not for him. Are we not a large consciousness, but a peaceful conscience." (Mother Teresa of St. Augustine, advice to novices).
"All my sisters have sacrificed more to God than me, because they made him the sacrifice of their freedom, instead I was a slave to the Court, and my chains, to be more brilliant, were not the least ones."
"My daughter, when we have something more painful than usual to support, or the kind of life we have embraced, or the influence of the seasons, we remember what Jesus Christ suffered for us; do we represent this immense weight of glory which he wants us to participate, and whose comparison with the heaviest weight we have to endure in this world is so clean to make it disappear."

Ancestry

Notes

References

Bibliography
 Calvimont, Victorine de. Mme Louise de France, carmélite. Bourdeaux: Ragot, 1855.
 De la Brière, Léon. Madame Louise de France. Paris: Victor Retaux, 1900.   
 Hours, Bernard. Madame Louise, Princesse au Carmel. Paris: Cerf, 1987.
 Proyart, Abbé. Vie de Madame Louise de France, Religieuse Carmélite, dédiée a Madame Elisabeth, Sœur du Roi Louis XVI. Par M. l'Abbé Proyart, de plusieurs Académies. Brussels: Chez Le Charlier, Libraire, 1793. Proyart's authoritative biography drew upon recollections of the Princess’ closest friends, including Madame Elisabeth, her niece and the dedicatee of the present work. However, before completing his work Proyart was forced to flee the Revolution and hence first published his work in Belgium (first edition: 1788).

External links
 Dossier biographique et bibliographie sur le site du Carmel de France
Venerable Therese of St. Augustine

1737 births
1787 deaths
18th-century French people
18th-century French nuns
18th-century venerated Christians
Princesses of France (Bourbon)
French people of Polish descent
People from Versailles
Discalced Carmelite nuns
Burials at the Basilica of Saint-Denis
Venerated Catholics
Venerated Carmelites
Roman Catholic royal saints
Children of Louis XV
Daughters of kings